Xylota flavifrons , (Walker, 1849), the  Northern Leafwalker , is an uncommon species of syrphid fly observed in the northeastern United States and all across Canada. Syrphid flies are also known as Hover Flies or Flower Flies because the adults are frequently found hovering around flowers from which they feed on nectar and pollen. The larvae of this genus live under bark in sap runs.

Distribution
Canada, United States.

References

Eristalinae
Insects described in 1849
Diptera of North America
Hoverflies of North America
Taxa named by Francis Walker (entomologist)